Samuel Baum (4 May 1914 – 19 June 2002) was an English footballer who played as a right winger for Bolton Wanderers, Darwen, South Shields, and Port Vale.

Career
Baum played for Bolton Wanderers in two spells, Darwen (on loan) and South Shields, before joining Port Vale in March 1938 with just two minutes of the transfer window remaining. He played just three Third Division North games before being handed a free transfer away from The Old Recreation Ground at the end of the 1937–38 season in May 1938.

Career statistics
Source:

References

1914 births
2002 deaths
Footballers from Sunderland
English footballers
Association football wingers
Bolton Wanderers F.C. players
Darwen F.C. players
South Shields F.C. (1936) players
Port Vale F.C. players
English Football League players